Electric Dreams is the debut album from the Australian all-female dance/house trio Slinkee Minx which was released on 28 July 2007. It is a two-disc album with 23 songs. All four of their hit singles are featured on the album, including "Summer Rain", "Closer", "Someday" and "Way of Life".

Track listing 
CD 1

CD 2

Personnel
 Annemarie Failla
 Michelle Palmer
 Belinda Tartaglia

References

2007 debut albums
Slinkee Minx albums
2007 remix albums